The Small World of Sammy Lee is a 1963 British crime film written and directed by Ken Hughes and starring Anthony Newley, Julia Foster and Robert Stephens. A striptease-show compere is hunted across the seedy London underworld of Soho by debt collectors.

Synopsis and outline 
Sammy Lee has five hours to pay off a gambling debt.

The film was based on a 1958 television play written and directed by Ken Hughes which also featured Anthony Newley in the lead.

Cast
 Anthony Newley as Sammy 'Lee' Leeman
 Julia Foster as Patsy
 Robert Stephens as Gerry Sullivan
 Wilfrid Brambell as Harry
 Warren Mitchell as Lou Leeman
 Miriam Karlin as Milly
 Kenneth J. Warren as Fred
 Clive Colin-Bowler as Johnny
 Toni Palmer as Joan
 Harry Locke as Stage Manager
 Al Mulock as Dealer
 Cyril Shaps as Maurice 'Morrie' Bellman
 Roy Kinnear as Lucky Dave
 Derek Nimmo as Rembrandt
 Harry Baird as Buddy Shine
 Alfred Burke as Big Eddie
 June Cunningham as Rita
 Elmer as Lofty
 Lynda Baron as Yvette
 Ken Wayne as Barman
 Kevin Brennan as Poker Player
 Billy Milton as Hardware Store Manager
 Ronald Radd as Big Alf

Original TV Version
The story was originally filmed for BBC TV by Hughes as Sammy in 1958. This version was a one person show and starred Newley.

Variety called it "a masterful piece of work."

Eddie
This in turn was adapted for American TV in 1958 as Eddie on Alcoa Theatre. It starred Mickey Rooney and was directed by Jack Smight. The production was censored at the last minute - during the final scene Rooney's character is beaten up, but the sponsors worried this was too violent. So instead the screen went dark for twenty seconds.

Variety called it "interesting, at times exciting."

Both Rooney and Smight won Emmies for the show.

Production
The original TV play was very successful and Hughes had requests to turn it into a feature, but he was reluctant, considering that the one-person aspect of the story was crucial. Eventually he decided to adapt it, but disliked the job he did. "I did everything wrong," he said. "I opened the story out in all the obvious ways. I showed what was happening at the other end of the telephone calls for instance when Sammy's end was all that was really needed." He then did another version which he liked.

In June 1962 it was announced Anthony Newley would star in the film version. Newley had just achieved a London stage success in Stop the World I Want to Get Off and would shortly repeat this success on Broadway. The film of Sammy was co produced by Kenneth Hyman of Seven Arts. It was one of Seven Arts' first distribution efforts. Newley called it "the drama of the perennial loser."

Julia Foster played the female lead. She says Ken Hughes was "scary... and he frightened me slightly". Foster said later when she confronted him about this, the director said he did that deliberately to make her feel more vulnerable. She appeared nude in the film which was rare at the time.

Music 
Music for the film was composed by Kenny Graham; a soundtrack album did not appear at the time of the film's release, but one was later released by Trunk Records in 2013.

Reception

Critical
The New York Times called it "monotonous".

Filmink later said "The film contains much to admire, including superb photography and acting... and a glimpse of Soho of the time. It is repetitive (Sammy tries to get money, almost gets it, doesn’t) and how much you like it will very much depend on your opinion of Anthony Newley."

Box Office
The film was a box office disaster and caused Bryanston to lose £80,000. Hughes said "nobody came near me" after the film came out.

Reputation today
Andrew Pulver wrote in November 2016 for The Guardian, at the time of the film's re-release: "It’s a genuine curiosity: the last knockings of black-and-white, beat-influenced hipster cinema before a tide of gaudily-coloured, new wave-inspired, pop art films. Ken Hughes, its director, reached back to the pre-war working-class bohemianism so perfectly captured by Graham Greene and Gerald Kersh".

References

External links

1958 TV play at IMDb
The Small World of Sammy Lee at Letterbox DVD
The Small World of Sammy Lee at Reel Streets

1963 films
1963 crime films
British black-and-white films
Films directed by Ken Hughes
British crime films
Films set in London
1960s English-language films
1960s British films